The Kazakhstan Ice Hockey Federation (Qazaqstan Hokkei Federasiasy (QHF)) is the governing body of ice hockey in Kazakhstan. Kazakhstan was one of nine former republics of the Soviet Union to join the International Ice Hockey Federation (IIHF) on 6 May 1992.

As of 2019, Kazakhstan has 6,478 registered ice hockey players.

National teams

Men
Men's national team
Men's under-20 national team
Men's under-18 national team

Women
Women's national team
Women's under-18 national team

References

External links
Kazakhstan at IIHF.com
Official website of the Kazakhstan Ice Hockey Federation 

Ice hockey governing bodies in Asia
Federation
International Ice Hockey Federation members
Ice hockey